The 1983 North Bedfordshire Borough Council election took place on 5 May 1983 to elect members of North Bedfordshire Borough Council in England. This was on the same day as  other local elections.

Summary

Election result

|}

References

Bedford
Bedford Borough Council elections
1980s in Bedfordshire